Edward Joseph Wisbar (May 3, 1916 – April 9, 1967) was an American professional basketball player. He played in the National Basketball League for the Pittsburgh Pirates during the 1937–38 season and averaged 5.8 points per game. Wisbar also played semi-professional basketball for a number of teams.

References

1916 births
1967 deaths
American men's basketball players
Basketball players from Pennsylvania
Centers (basketball)
People from Duquesne, Pennsylvania
Pittsburgh Pirates (NBL) players